Russian Afghans are Russian citizens and non-citizen residents born in, or with ancestors from, Afghanistan living in Russia and the second largest Afghan community in Europe is part of the Afghan diaspora. A third of the population live in Moscow and the largest community is found around the Sevastopol Hotel, which is home to thousands of Afghan residents and many Afghan-run businesses. In 2007 UNHCR reported many, including children of officials who worked for the pro-Soviet government in Kabul during the 1980s, have failed to gain refugee status. Refugee status approval rate had been between 2% to 5% and about 30% for temporary asylum applications. Many Afghans had entered Russia through Uzbekistan and Tajikistan and were blocked from making refugee application under the “safe third country” rule. Between 1997 and end of 2007, only  844 Afghans were granted refugee status in Russia. Between 2002 and 2007, only 548 Afghans were voluntarily repatriated from Russia with the help of UNHCR.

In 2021, the Russian government requested that 1,000 Afghans be allowed to fly from Afghanistan to Russia following the 2021 Taliban offensive.

Notable people 
Said Karimulla Khalili

References

See also
Afghanistan–Russia relations

Russia
Islam in Russia
Muslim communities in Europe
Afghanistan–Russia relations